John Clellon Holmes (March 12, 1926, Holyoke, Massachusetts – March 30, 1988, Middletown, Connecticut) was an American author, poet and professor, best known for his 1952 novel Go. Considered the first "Beat" novel, Go depicted events in his life with his friends Jack Kerouac, Neal Cassady and Allen Ginsberg. He was often referred to as the "quiet Beat" and was one of Kerouac's closest friends. Holmes also wrote what is considered the definitive jazz novel of the Beat Generation, The Horn.

Life and career
Holmes was more an observer and documenter of beat characters like Ginsberg, Cassady and Kerouac than one of them. He asked Ginsberg for "any and all information on your poetry and your visions," (shortly before Ginsberg's admission into the hospital) saying that "I am interested in knowing also anything you may wish to tell... about Neal, Huncke, Lucien in relation to you..." (referring to Herbert Huncke and Lucien Carr), to which Ginsberg replied with an 11-page letter detailing, as completely as he could, the nature of his "divine vision".

The origin of the term beat being applied to a generation was conceived by Jack Kerouac who told Holmes, "You know, this is really a beat generation." The term later became part of common parlance when Holmes published an article in The New York Times Magazine entitled "This Is the Beat Generation" on November 16, 1952 (pg.10). In the article, Holmes attributes the term to Kerouac, who had acquired the idea from Herbert Huncke. Holmes came to the conclusion that the values and ambitions of the Beat Generation were symbolic of something bigger, which was the inspiration for Go.

Later in life, Holmes taught at the University of Arkansas, lectured at Yale and gave workshops at Brown University. He died of cancer in 1988.

Bibliography 
 Go (1952)
 The Horn (1958)
 The Philosophy of the Beat Generation (1958)
 Get Home Free (1964)
 Nothing More to Declare (1967)
 The Bowling Green Poems (1977)
 Death Drag: Selected Poems 1948–1979 (1979)
 Visitor: Jack Kerouac in Old Saybrook (1981)
 Gone in October: Last Reflections on Jack Kerouac (1985)
 Displaced Person: The Travel Essays (1987)
 Representative Men: The Biographical Essays (1988)
 Passionate Opinions: The Cultural Essays (1988)
 Dire Coasts: Poems (1988)
 Night Music: Selected Poems (1989)

Notes

References
Charters, Ann (ed.). The Portable Beat Reader. Penguin Books. New York. 1992.  (hc);  (pbk)
 Collins, Ronald & Skover, David.  Mania: The Story of the Outraged & Outrageous Lives that Launched a Cultural Revolution (Top-Five Books, March 2013)

External links 
John Clellon Holmes: Gallery of book covers
John Clellon Holmes: Recordings
John Clellon Holmes: Papers at Kent State University
"This Is the Beat Generation," The New York Times, November 16, 1952.

1926 births
1988 deaths
20th-century American novelists
American male novelists
Beat Generation writers
Writers from Holyoke, Massachusetts
20th-century American male writers
Novelists from Massachusetts